The 1988 AFC U-16 Championship was the 3rd edition of the AFC U-16 Championship, organised by the Asian Football Confederation (AFC). It was played by Asian under-16 teams and also served as a qualification tournament for the 1989 FIFA U-16 World Championship to be held at Scotland. Saudi Arabia won the tournament by winning 2–0 in the final against Bahrain; both teams qualified to the 1989 FIFA U-16 World Championship, along with third-placed China.

Qualification

Qualified teams:

 

 
 

 

 (host)

Group stage

Group A

Group B

Knockout stage

Semifinals

Third-place match

Final

Winners

Tournament ranking

Teams qualified for 1989 FIFA U-16 World Championship

Sources
rsssf.com

Under-16
International association football competitions hosted by Thailand
1988 in Thai sport
1988 in youth association football
November 1988 sports events in Asia